Stenochilus crocatus is a species of spider in the genus Stenochilus.

References

Araneomorphae
Endemic fauna of Sri Lanka
Spiders of Asia
Spiders described in 1884